The Warrior-class strike craft (ex Minister class) are in service with the South African Navy, with the design being a modified Sa'ar 4 (Reshef)-class fast attack craft. The class was initially known as the Minister class as all the boats were named after South African Ministers of Defence, before being renamed Warrior-class after 1994. The strike craft flotilla was known as SAS Scorpion.

History
In March 1971, a South African project team visited Britain, France and Portugal to investigate alternative designs for future frigates or corvettes. A decision was made to buy corvettes from Portugal, with four ships of an upgraded version of the  being ordered.

The then Minister of Defence, P. W. Botha, had already started discussions with Israel to buy their Reshef-class missile boats, designated Project Japonica.

In 1974, a contract was signed with Israeli Military Industries for the construction of three of the modified Reshef-class vessels at the Haifa facility of Israeli Shipyards. A further three were built immediately after at the Sandock-Austral shipyard in Durban, South Africa, with three more being built at the same facility several years later. The imposition of the international embargo on the sale of arms to South Africa on 4 November 1977 forced the project to be carried out under a cloak of security.  The South African variants were fitted with Gabriel missiles, otherwise known as 'Scorpion' missiles, and had two Oto Melara 76 mm guns instead of a single one with a Phalanx CIWS.

SAS Scorpion

With the arrival of the strike craft, a strike craft flotilla was formed in 1977 under the command of Captain Glen Syndercombe. This flotilla was renamed SAS Scorpion in 1980.

The flotilla was formed into two squadrons in 1985, with four ships being in service at one time in Squadron 1 and two in service with Squadron 2, which was based in Simon's Town.

Conversion to Offshore Patrol Vessel
Three decommissioned Warrior-class strike craft were refurbished by SA Shipyards and recommissioned as offshore patrol vessels (OPVs) from 2012 to 2014. Their aged Skerpioen missile launchers were removed, providing extra room for a small RHIB boat and a small contingent of seaborne commandos to board suspect vessels. Re-classed as OPVs, these vessels are armed with one OTO Melara 76 mm naval artillery gun, the rear one of the two originally fitted having been removed, as well as a pair of 20mm guns and a pair of 12.7mm heavy machine guns. Rear Admiral Hanno Teuteberg, Chief Director Maritime Strategy, said in 2013 that the early indications are that the life of the OPV vessels can be extended for at least five or more years, to coincide with Project Biro, the new build Offshore/Inshore patrol vessel project.

Three of the former strike craft were refurbished and recommissioned as SAS Isaac Dyobha (P1565), SAS Galeshewe (P1567) and SAS Makhanda (P1569). As of 2023, only SAS Makhanda remains in active service. Her home port is Naval Base Durban, which is undergoing an upgrade in preparation for the new patrol flotilla which will consist of similarly named Warrior Class Inshore Patrol Vessels currently under construction.

Ships in Class
A total of 9 boats were delivered to the South African Navy.

See also
 List of decommissioned ships of the South African Navy
 List of ships of the South African Navy

References

Ships of the South African Navy
Israel–South Africa relations